Karberghus is a Danish real estate company based in Copenhagen, Denmark. It specializes in the acquisition, restoration and renting out of historic properties in the Copenhagen area and is a member of BYFO, Historiske Huse and Europa Nostra. Karberghus is the owner of the company Office Club offering coworking in historic buildings in Copenhagen.

History
The company traces its history back to 1917 when Hans Just constructed a combined headquarters and warehouse on Århusgade in the Østerbro district of Copenhagen. The portfolio was later expanded with several storage buildings in suburban Copenhagen. Since 2005 the company has invested in historic properties.

Portfolio

References

External links
 Official website

Real estate companies of Denmark
Companies based in Copenhagen
Danish companies established in 1917
Companies based in Copenhagen Municipality